Storforsen is a waterfall on the Pite River in Swedish Norrbottens län is located approximately 38 km northwest of Älvsbyn. With an average flow of 187 m3/s, the rapids are one of the most voluminous in Europe. The rapids stretch over a distance of 5 km in which it drops 82 meters 60 of which are a single waterfall.

Flow usually is highest at midsummer: 870 m3/s. During the floodyear 1995 a volume of 1200 cubic metres flowed down Storforsen each second.

To prevent accidents the rocks surrounding the rapids are fenced, views being readily accessible to the public via ramps. While the rapids were used in previous years to transport logs, today its surroundings are part of a nature park, visited by 150,000 people each year.

Image gallery

See also
List of waterfalls by flow rate

References

External links
 Storforsen at the website of Älvsbyn municipality 

Pite River basin
Rapids
Rivers of Norrbotten County